Mount Horrible is a summit of the Blue Mountains in Asotin County, Washington, in the United States. Along with neighboring Mount Misery, it was named by 19th century pioneers for the difficult conditions they experienced on the Grouse Flat.

References

Mountains of Asotin County, Washington
Mountains of Washington (state)